Jason Thomas Ridley (born July 19, 1977) is an American politician from Georgia. Ridley is a Republican member of Georgia House of Representatives for District 6.

References

Republican Party members of the Georgia House of Representatives
21st-century American politicians
Living people
1977 births